René Enders (born 13 February 1987) is a German track cyclist. He won two bronze Olympic medals with the German team in the team sprint: in 2008 and in 2012. He competed for Germany at the 2016 Summer Olympics as a member of the men's sprint team. They finished in 5th place.

References

External links

 
 

1987 births
Living people
People from Zeulenroda-Triebes
People from Bezirk Gera
German track cyclists
German male cyclists
Cyclists from Thuringia
Olympic cyclists of Germany
Cyclists at the 2008 Summer Olympics
Cyclists at the 2012 Summer Olympics
Cyclists at the 2016 Summer Olympics
Olympic bronze medalists for Germany
Olympic medalists in cycling
UCI Track Cycling World Champions (men)
Medalists at the 2012 Summer Olympics
Medalists at the 2008 Summer Olympics
21st-century German people